Sesamothamnus leistneranus is a species of plant in the Pedaliaceae family. It is endemic to Namibia. Its natural habitat is subtropical or tropical dry shrubland.

References

Endemic flora of Namibia
Pedaliaceae
Least concern plants
Taxonomy articles created by Polbot